Harold Bertram Turbott  (5 August 1899 – 16 March 1988) was a New Zealand medical doctor, public health administrator, broadcaster and writer. For four decades he broadcast a weekly talk on health on the radio.

Early life 
Turbott was born in Auckland on 5 August 1899, moving to Hamilton as a child where he attended Hamilton High School. He was dux of the school and went on to study medicine at the University of Otago, qualifying in 1923 after topping the class in midwifery.

Career 
Turbott's first job was as a house surgeon at Waikato Hospital; he intended to become a surgeon. In 1923 he was persuaded that experience in India and China would be valuable and he went to work in a hospital near Canton (Guangzhou). While in China he spent three months researching hookworm for the Rockefeller Foundation, followed by a course in radiology in Beijing (Peking).

By the time he returned to New Zealand he had decided on a career in public health but as graduates from Britain were preferred in the field he returned to Dunedin to lecture in bacteriology and to complete a diploma in public health. In 1927 he became assistant medical officer of health (MoH) in Auckland. He was able to initiate a diphtheria immunisation programme for school children to quell an epidemic.

Later in 1927 he was appointed MoH in Gisborne. This was interrupted by a period in 1928 when he was in Western Samoa with the expeditionary force to quell the Mau uprising.

As MoH in Gisborne, Turbott recognised the problems causing Māori ill health: infectious diseases, poor housing, and inadequate water supplies and waste disposal. In 1933 he worked on tuberculosis in Māori on a fellowship from the British Medical Research Council. The community was resistant to the project so Turbott sought the assistance of Sir Āpirana Ngata who was Minister of Maori Affairs. Turbott was able to instigate isolation shelters for the home treatment of tuberculosis patients.

From 1935 to 1936, Turbott was chief medical officer in Western Samoa where there was a need to tackle tropical diseases and infant welfare. Returning to Auckland in 1936 he became MoH in South Auckland. There was high Māori mortality, and diphtheria, typhoid and tuberculosis were rife. In 1940, Turbott's campaign for public health, particularly better sanitation, was recognised by the prime minister Peter Fraser and government allocated £40,000 for the construction of privies and water tanks. This initiative was supported by Te Puea Herangi.

In 1940, Turbott took up the position of director of school hygiene in the Department of Health where he promoted the public health nursing service. In 1947, he became deputy director general of health (public health), and director general of health in 1959. His appointment to director general was marred by an appeal by Dr A. W. S. Thompson who then sued Turbott for damages because of comments Turbott made during the appeal process.

Radio doctor 
Turbott became the radio doctor from 1943 to 1984 broadcasting a seven-minute talk on health every week, taking on the position from Colin Scrimgeour. The radio doctor talks were viewed with some suspicion by his colleagues but later grudgingly accepted.

Other activities 
Turbott was president of the World Health Organization from 1960 to 1961 and chairman from 1964 to 1965. He served on the Wellington Hospital Board from 1968 to 1983. He also served on other organisations: the local drainage board, the Traffic Institute and the Old People's Welfare Council.

Honours
In 1953, Turbott was awarded the Queen Elizabeth II Coronation Medal. In the 1959 Queen's Birthday Honours, he was appointed a Companion of the Imperial Service Order.

Personal life
Turbott married his first wife Eveline Arthur in 1923. After their divorce he married Robinetta Jamieson in 1938. He had one daughter and two sons, one of whom was Harry Turbott, a New Zealand architect.

Turbott died on 16 March 1988 in Hutt Hospital, Lower Hutt.

Publications

References

Further reading 
 Dow, Derek. (2003). The long locum: health propaganda in New Zealand. New Zealand Medical Journal. Vol 116, no. 1170. Discusses Turbott's role in the development of public health in New Zealand.

External links 
 Harold Turbott talking about his career. NZ Ministry of Culture and Heritage
 Politics, War and Progress: The broad picture 1935–1949. RNZ.

1899 births
1988 deaths
New Zealand public health doctors
People from Auckland
People educated at Hamilton Boys' High School
University of Otago alumni
New Zealand broadcasters
New Zealand Companions of the Imperial Service Order
Hutt City Councillors
Wellington Hospital Board members